Ranjeet Singh Judeo (1942/1943 – 8 March 2023) was an Indian politician. A representative of the Indian National Congress, he had been elected for the Garautha in the state of Uttar Pradesh. He was a six-term Member of the Legislative Assembly.

He was the son of Radha Charan Singh, the last ruler of Samthar, a princely state in the British Raj.

References

External links 

1940s births
2023 deaths
Lok Sabha members from Uttar Pradesh
Indian National Congress politicians from Uttar Pradesh
People from Jhansi district